The Harpist is a 1997 British-German drama film directed by Hansjörg Thurn and starring Geraldine O'Rawe, Christien Anholt and Stephen McGann. Its plot concerns a young German who travels to Hamburg to see an Irish harpist whom he has become obsessed with. Its German title is Die Harfenspielerin.

Partial cast
 Geraldine O'Rawe - Rebecca Kennedy
 Christien Anholt - Ferdinand Rupitsch
 Stephen McGann - Henry Kennedy
 B.J. Hogg - Vinz
 John Kavanagh - Puder
 Colin Baker - Father Rupitsch
 Tim Hudson - Otto
 Pax Lohan - Mrs. Brusis
 Barbara Murray - Mrs. Budde
 Robert Beck - Thug

References

External links

1999 films
German drama films
1999 drama films
English-language German films
British drama films
1990s British films
1990s German films